Gwyllyn Samuel Newton "Glenn" Ford (May 1, 1916 – August 30, 2006) was a Canadian-American actor who often portrayed ordinary men in unusual circumstances. Ford was most prominent during Hollywood's Golden Age as one of the biggest box-office draws of the 1940s, 1950s, and 1960s, who had a career that lasted more than 50 years. Although he played in many genres of movies, some of his most significant roles were in the film noirs Gilda (1946) and The Big Heat (1953), and the high school angst film Blackboard Jungle (1955). However, it was for comedies or westerns which he received acting laurels, including three Golden Globe Nominations for Best Actor in a Comedy movie, winning for Pocketful of Miracles (1961). He also played a supporting role as Clark Kent's adoptive father, Jonathan Kent, in Superman (1978).

Five of his films have been selected for the National Film Registry by the Library of Congress as being "culturally, historically or aesthetically" significant: Gilda (1946), The Big Heat (1953), Blackboard Jungle (1955), 3:10 to Yuma (1957) and Superman (1978).

Early life
Gwyllyn Samuel Newton Ford was born on May 1, 1916, in Sainte-Christine-d'Auvergne, Quebec, the son of Hannah Wood (née Mitchell) and Newton Ford, an engineer with the Canadian Pacific Railway. Through his father, Ford was a great-nephew of Canada's first Prime Minister, Sir John A. Macdonald, and was also related to U.S. President Martin Van Buren. In 1922, when Ford was six, the family moved first to Venice, California and then to Santa Monica; Newton became a motorman for the Venice Electric Tram Company, a job he held until he died at age 50 in 1940.

While attending Santa Monica High School, he was active in school drama productions with other future actors such as James Griffith.  After graduation, he began working in small theatre groups. While in high school, he took odd jobs, including working for Will Rogers, who taught him horsemanship. Ford later commented that his father had no objection to his growing interest in acting, but told him, "It's all right for you to try to act, if you learn something else first. Be able to take a car apart and put it together. Be able to build a house, every bit of it. Then you'll always have something." Ford heeded the advice and during the 1950s, when he was one of Hollywood's most popular actors, he regularly worked on plumbing, wiring, and air conditioning at home.

Ford became a naturalized citizen of the United States on November 10, 1939.

Early career

Columbia Pictures
Ford acted in West Coast stage companies and had a role in the short Night in Manhattan (1937) before joining Columbia Pictures in 1939. His stage name came from his father's hometown of Glenford, Alberta.

His first major movie part was in Heaven with a Barbed Wire Fence (1939) at 20th Century Fox, written by Dalton Trumbo. Ford's first movie for Columbia was a "B", My Son Is Guilty (1939). He went on to other "B" movies such as Convicted Woman (1940), Men Without Souls (1940), Babies for Sale (1940) and Blondie Plays Cupid (1941).

Ford was in the bigger budgeted The Lady in Question (1940), which co-starred Rita Hayworth. This was a well-received courtroom drama in which Ford plays a young man who falls in love with Rita Hayworth when his father, Brian Aherne, tries to rehabilitate her in their bicycle shop. Directed by Hungarian emigre Charles Vidor, the two rising young stars instantly bonded.

So Ends Our Night
Top Hollywood director John Cromwell was impressed enough with his work to borrow him from Columbia for the independently produced drama, So Ends Our Night (1941), where Ford delivered a poignant portrayal of a 19-year-old German exile on the run in Nazi-occupied Europe.

Working with Academy Award-winning Fredric March and wooing (onscreen) 30-year-old Margaret Sullivan, recently nominated for an Oscar, Ford's shy, ardent young refugee riveted attention even in such stellar company.  "Glenn Ford, a most promising newcomer," wrote The New York Timess Bosley Crowther in a review on February 28, 1941, "draws more substance and appealing simplicity from his role of the boy than any one else in the cast."

After the film's highly publicized premiere in Los Angeles and a gala fundraiser in Miami, President Franklin Roosevelt saw the film in a private screening at the White House, and admired the film greatly.  Ford was invited to Roosevelt's annual Birthday Ball.  He returned to Los Angeles and promptly registered as a Democrat, a fervent FDR supporter. "I was so impressed when I met Franklin and Eleanor Roosevelt,"  recalled Glenn Ford to his son decades later, "I was thrilled when I got back to Los Angeles and found a beautiful photograph personally autographed to me. It always held a place of high honor in my home."

After 35 interviews and glowing reviews for him personally, Glenn Ford had young female fans begging for his autograph, too.  However, the young man was disappointed when Columbia Pictures did nothing with this prestige and new visibility and instead kept plugging him into conventional films for the rest of his 7-year contract.  His next picture Texas was his first Western, a genre with which he would be associated for the rest of his life.  Set after the Civil War, it paired him with another young male star under contract, William Holden, who became a lifelong friend.  More routine films followed, none of them memorable, but lucrative enough to allow Ford to buy his mother and himself a beautiful new home in the Pacific Palisades.

So Ends Our Night also affected the young star in another way: in the summer of 1941, while the United States was still neutral, he enlisted in the Coast Guard Auxiliary,  though he had a class 3 deferment (for being his mother's sole support). He began his training in September 1941, driving three nights a week to his unit in San Pedro and spending most weekends there.

He continued to appear in movies for Columbia such as Go West, Young Lady (1941), and The Adventures of Martin Eden (1942).

World War II and Eleanor Powell

Ten months after Ford's portrait of a young anti-Nazi exile, the United States entered World War II. After playing a young pilot in his 11th Columbia film, Flight Lieutenant (1942),  Ford went on a cross-country 12-city tour to sell war bonds for Army and Navy Relief. In the midst of the many stars also donating their time – from Bob Hope to Cary Grant to Claudette Colbert – he met the popular dancing star Eleanor Powell. The two soon fell in love; they attended the official opening of the Hollywood USO together in October.

Ford made The Desperadoes (1942), another Western. Then, while making another war drama, Destroyer with ardent anti-fascist Edward G. Robinson, Ford impulsively volunteered for the United States Marine Corps Reserve on December 13, 1942.  The startled studio had to beg the Marines to give their second male lead four more weeks to complete shooting.  In the meantime, Ford proposed to Eleanor Powell, who subsequently announced her retirement from the screen to be near her fiancé as he started boot camp.

Ford recalled to his son that William Holden, who had joined the Army Air Corps, and Ford had "talked about it and we were both convinced that our careers, which were just getting established, would likely be forgotten by the time we got back ... if we got back."

He was assigned in March 1943 to active duty at the Marine Corps Base in San Diego. With his Coast Guard service, he was offered a position as an officer, but Ford declined, feeling it would be interpreted as preferential treatment for a movie star and instead entered the Marines as a private. He trained at the Marine base in San Diego, where Tyrone Power, the number-one male movie star at the time, was also based. Power suggested Ford join him in the Marines' weekly radio show Halls of Montezuma, broadcast Sunday evenings from San Diego.  Ford excelled in training, winning the Rifle Marksman Badge and being named "Honor Man" of the platoon and promoted to sergeant by the time he finished.

Awaiting assignment at Camp Pendleton Marine Corps base, Ford volunteered to play a Marine raider – uncredited – in the film Guadalcanal Diary,  made by Fox, with Ford and others charging up the beaches of Southern California. He later showed this to his little boy Peter, along with his many other black-and-white battle scenes in other films.  Frustratingly for Ford, filming battle scenes was the closest he would ever get to any action.  After being sent to Marine Corps Schools Detachment (Photographic Section) in Quantico, Virginia, three months later, Ford returned to the San Diego base in February 1944 and was assigned to the radio section of the Public Relations Office, Headquarters Company, Base Headquarters Battalion, where he resumed work on Halls of Montezuma.

Just as Eleanor, now his wife, was expecting the birth of their child and Ford himself was looking forward to Officers Training School, he was hospitalized at the U.S. Naval Hospital in San Diego with what turned out to be duodenal ulcers, which afflicted him for the rest of his life.  He was in and out of the hospital for the next five months and finally received a medical discharge on the third anniversary of Pearl Harbor, December 7, 1944. Though without the combat duty he had been hoping for, Ford was awarded several service medals for his three years in the Marines Reserve Corps: the American Campaign Medal, the Asiatic-Pacific Campaign Medal, and the World War II Victory Medal, created in 1945 for anyone who had been on active duty since December 1941.
After the war, Ford continued his military career in the Naval Reserve well into the Vietnam War, achieving the rank of captain.

Stardom

Gilda
The most memorable role of Ford's early career came with his first postwar film in 1946, starring alongside Rita Hayworth in Gilda. This was Glenn Ford's second pairing with Hayworth; like the first it was directed by Charles Vidor.

The New York Times movie reviewer Bosley Crowther did not much like or as he freely admitted even understand the movie, but he noted that Ford "just returned from war duty" and did show  "a certain stamina and poise in the role of a tough young gambler."

Reviewing the film in 1946, Crowther did not yet have the phrase by which Gilda would soon after be associated,  a term that the French critics had not in 1946 even invented: film noir.  The erotic sadism and covert homoeroticism were actively encouraged on set by director Vidor, a sophisticated Budapest-born expatriate, though Glenn Ford always denied any awareness of the latter in his character's fervent loyalty to his boss, who had unwittingly married the love of Johnny's life.

The film was entered in the Cannes Film Festival, then in its first year. Ford went on to be a leading man opposite Hayworth in a total of five films. and the two, after their location romance (his marriage survived, hers did not)  became lifelong friends and next-door neighbors. Beautifully shot in black-and-white by cinematographer Rudolph Mate, Gilda has endured as a classic of film noir. It has a 96% rating on Rotten Tomatoes, and, in 2013, was selected for preservation in the United States National Film Registry by the Library of Congress as being "culturally, historically, or aesthetically significant".

Leading Star
Now established as a star of "A" movies, Ford was borrowed by Warners to play Bette Davis' leading man in A Stolen Life (1946). Back at Columbia he was in Gallant Journey (1946) a biopic of John Joseph Montgomery then he did a thriller Framed (1947) and a comedy The Mating of Millie (1948). He and Hayworth were reunited with Vidor in the expensive color drama, The Loves of Carmen (1948).

Ford appeared in a comedy, The Return of October (1948) and a popular Western The Man from Colorado (1948). The latter co-starred William Holden. Both Ford and his friend William Holden flourished throughout the 1950s and 1960s, but Ford was frustrated that he was not given the opportunity to work with directors of the caliber that Holden did in his Oscar-winning career, such as Billy Wilder and David Lean. He missed out on From Here to Eternity – as did Rita Hayworth – when production was stalled by Columbia studio head Harry Cohn. He also made the mistake, which he bitterly regretted later, of turning down the lead in the brilliant comedy  Born Yesterday (also planned with Rita Hayworth), which Holden then snatched up.

Columbia kept Ford constantly busy: The Undercover Man (1949), a film noir; Lust for Gold (1949), a Western with Ida Lupino; and Mr. Soft Touch (1949), another noir. MGM borrowed him for The Doctor and the Girl (1950) and he went over to RKO for The White Tower (1950).

Back at Columbia Ford did Convicted (1950) with Broderick Crawford and The Flying Missile, a Cold War Movie.

Freelance Star
Ford went to Paramount for The Redhead and the Cowboy (1951) and Fox for Follow the Sun (1951) where he played Ben Hogan, and the Western The Secret of Convict Lake (1951). At United Artists he starred in The Green Glove (1952) then MGM called him back for Young Man with Ideas (1952).

Ford was reunited with Rita Hayworth a third time in Affair in Trinidad (1952). He went to Britain to star in MGM's Time Bomb (1953) then to Universal for the Western The Man from the Alamo (1953).

Ford made Plunder of the Sun (1953) with John Farrow, then was cast in the lead of The Big Heat (1953), Fritz Lang's classic crime melodrama with Gloria Grahame, at Columbia. After Appointment in Honduras (1953) at RKO, Ford reunited with Lang and Grahame in Human Desire (1954). Ford did two Westerns, The Americano (1955) at RKO and The Violent Men (1955) at Columbia.

MGM

Blackboard Jungle
Ford's career went up another notch when cast in the lead of Blackboard Jungle (1955), a landmark film of teen angst at MGM. Unlike the comparatively white-bread Rebel Without a Cause and The Wild One, Blackboard Jungle tackled racial conflicts head-on as Ford played an idealistic, harassed teacher at an urban high school that included a very young Sidney Poitier and other black and Hispanic cast members, while Vic Morrow played a dangerous juvenile delinquent. Bill Haley's "Rock Around the Clock" under the opening credits was the first use of a rock and roll song in a Hollywood film. Richard Brooks, the film's writer and director, had discovered the music when he heard Ford's son Peter playing the record at Glenn Ford's home.

The movie was a huge hit and MGM signed Ford to a long-term contract. They put him in Interrupted Melody (1955) a biopic of Marjorie Lawrence with Eleanor Parker, and another big success.  So too were the dramas Trial (1956) and Ransom! (1956).

Ford returned to Columbia for the Western Jubal (1956), then back at MGM made another Western, the hugely popular The Fastest Gun Alive (1956).

Comedy
Ford's versatility allowed him to star in a number of popular comedies, almost always as the beleaguered, well-meaning, but nonplussed straight man, set upon by circumstances as in The Teahouse of the August Moon (1956), in which he played an American soldier sent to Okinawa to convert the occupied island's natives to the American way of life, and is instead converted by them.

Every movie Ford starred in around this time was a hit: 3:10 to Yuma (1957), a classic Western at Columbia; Don't Go Near the Water (1957), a service comedy at MGM; and Cowboy (1958) with Jack Lemmon at Columbia.

Ford first worked with director George Marshall in The Sheepman (1958), a popular Western at MGM. They reteamed on the service comedy Imitation General (1958). Ford a war movie, Torpedo Run (1958). He and Marshall made two comedies with Debbie Reynolds, It Started with a Kiss (1959) and The Gazebo (1959). At the end of the fifties Ford was one of the biggest stars in Hollywood.

1960s
Ford's first financial flop since he reached star status was the epic Western Cimarron (1960). He did some comedies: Cry for Happy (1961) with Marshall and Pocketful of Miracles (1961), with Frank Capra, neither of which was as well received as his fifties comedies.

Ford was cast in the lead of The Four Horsemen of the Apocalypse (1961), a notorious box office fiasco.

Ford's box office standing recovered with the thriller Experiment in Terror (1962) and the comedy The Courtship of Eddie's Father (1963).  Less popular were the comedies Love Is a Ball (1963) and Advance to the Rear (1964), the latter directed by Marshall. He was in the drama Fate Is the Hunter (1964) and the romantic comedy Dear Heart (1964).

Ford made two films with Burt Kennedy The Rounders (1965), and The Money Trap (1965). He was one of many famous faces in Is Paris Burning? (1966) and went to Mexico for Rage (1966).

Ford was in some Westerns: A Time for Killing (1967), The Last Challenge (1967), Day of the Evil Gun (1968), Smith! (1968), and Heaven with a Gun (1969).

Later career
In 1976, Ford played RAdm Raymond Spruance in the epic Midway alongside Henry Fonda, who played Adm Chester Nimitz, and Charlton Heston, who played a fictional Capt. Matt Garth. In 1978, Ford had a supporting role in Superman as Clark Kent's adoptive father Jonathan Kent. In Ford's final scene in the film, "Rock Around the Clock" is heard on a car radio.

Later military service 
After serving in World War II, Ford joined up for yet a third time in 1958.  He entered the U.S. Naval Reserve, was commissioned as a lieutenant commander and was made a public affairs officer – the position he had portrayed the previous year in the successful comedy Don't Go Near the Water. During his annual training tours, he promoted the navy through radio and television broadcasts, personal appearances, and documentary films.

Ford continued to combine his film career with his military service, and was promoted to commander in 1963 and captain in 1968, after he went to Vietnam in 1967 for a month's tour of duty as a location scout for combat scenes in a training film entitled Global Marine.  In support of Democratic President Lyndon Johnson's escalation of the Vietnam War, he traveled with a combat camera crew from the demilitarized zone south to the Mekong Delta. For his service in Vietnam, the navy awarded him a Navy Commendation Medal.  He finally retired from the Naval Reserve in the 1970s with the rank of captain. He was awarded the Marine Corps Reserve Ribbon, which recognizes those who spend 10 years of honorable reserve service.

Television 
In 1971, Ford signed with CBS to star in his first television series, a half-hour comedy/drama titled The Glenn Ford Show. However, CBS head Fred Silverman noticed that many of the featured films being shown at a Glenn Ford film festival were Westerns. He suggested doing a Western series, instead, which resulted in the "modern-day Western" series, Cade's County. Ford played southwestern Sheriff Cade for one season (1971–1972) in a mix of police mystery and western drama.

In The Family Holvak (1975–1976), Ford portrayed a Depression-era preacher in a family drama, reprising the same character he had played in the TV film, The Greatest Gift.
 
In 1978, Ford was host, presenter and narrator of the disaster documentary series When Havoc Struck for the Mobil Showcase Network.

In 1981, Ford co-starred with Melissa Sue Anderson in the slasher film Happy Birthday to Me.

In 1991, Ford agreed to star in a cable network series, African Skies. However, prior to the start of the series, he developed blood clots in his legs which required a lengthy stay in Cedars-Sinai Medical Center. Eventually, he recovered, but at one time his situation was so severe that he was listed in critical condition. Ford was forced to drop out of the series and was replaced by Robert Mitchum.

The 2006 film Superman Returns includes a scene where Ma Kent (played by Eva Marie Saint) stands next to the living room mantel after Superman returns from his quest to find remnants of Krypton. On that mantel is a picture of Glenn Ford as Pa Kent.

Radio 
In 1950, Ford played the title role in The Adventures of Christopher London, created by Erle Stanley Gardner and directed by William N. Robson. London was a private investigator in the weekly adventure series, which ran on Sundays at 7 p.m. on the NBC radio network from January 22 to April 30, 1950.  Ford also starred in the June 2, 1947 episode of Suspense, "End of the Road".

Personal life

Ford's first wife was actress and dancer Eleanor Powell (1943–1959), with whom he had his only child, actor Peter Ford (born 1945). The couple appeared together on screen once in a short film produced in the 1950s titled Have Faith in Our Children. When they married, Powell was more famous than Ford. Ford and Powell would divorce in 1959.

Ford did not remain on good terms with his ex-wives. He was a notorious womanizer who had affairs with many of his leading ladies, including Rita Hayworth, Maria Schell, Geraldine Brooks, Stella Stevens, Gloria Grahame, Gene Tierney, Eva Gabor and Barbara Stanwyck. He had a one-night stand with Marilyn Monroe in 1962 and a fling with Joan Crawford in the early 1940s.

Ford dated Christiane Schmidtmer, Linda Christian and Vikki Dougan during the mid-1960s, and he also had relationships with Judy Garland, Connie Stevens, Suzanne Pleshette, Rhonda Fleming, Roberta Collins, Susie Lund, Terry Moore, Angie Dickinson, Debbie Reynolds, Jill St. John, Brigitte Bardot and Loretta Young. However, he subsequently married actress Kathryn Hays (1966–1969); marriages to Cynthia Hayward (1977–1984), and Jeanne Baus (1993–1994) would later follow. However, all four marriages would end in divorce. He also had a long-term relationship with actress Hope Lange in the early 1960s. According to his son Peter Ford's book Glenn Ford: A Life (2011), Ford had affairs with 146 actresses, all of which were documented in his personal diaries, including a 40-year, on-and off-again affair with Rita Hayworth that began during the filming of Gilda in 1945. Their affair resumed during the making of their 1948 film The Loves of Carmen; Ford impregnated Hayworth, and she later traveled to France to get an abortion. 

In 1960, Ford would move next door to Hayworth in Beverly Hills, and they continued their relationship for many years until the early 1980s. 

Ford's affair with stripper and cult actress Liz Renay was chronicled by her in the 1991 book My First 2,000 Men. She ranked Ford as one of her top five best lovers.

Ford also documented his many relationships by taping every phone conversation he ever had with all of his celebrity lovers and friends for 40 years. Presidents Richard Nixon and Ronald Reagan are on these recordings, as well as Rita Hayworth, Frank Sinatra, William Holden, John Wayne, Cary Grant, Ava Gardner, Gregory Peck, James Mason, Lucille Ball, James Stewart, Henry Fonda, Angie Dickinson, Joan Crawford, Bette Davis, Charlton Heston and Debbie Reynolds. Ford installed the recording system to eavesdrop on the conversations of his first wife, Eleanor Powell, fearing that she would find out about his serial cheating and leave him. She later divorced him in 1959 on the grounds of adultery and mental cruelty.

Ford had also been engaged to Debra Morris in the 1980s and Karen Johnson in the early 1990s.

At the height of his stardom, Glenn Ford supported the Democratic Party. He supported Franklin D. Roosevelt in the 1940s, Adlai Stevenson II in 1956, and John F. Kennedy in 1960. Ford later switched his support to the Republican Party. He campaigned for his old friend, and fellow actor, Ronald Reagan, in the 1980 and 1984 presidential elections.

In May 1980, Ford attempted to purchase the Atlanta Flames, of the National Hockey League, with the intention of keeping the team in the city. He was prepared to match a $14 million offer made by Byron and Daryl Seaman, but was outbid by an investment group led by Nelson Skalbania, which included the Seaman brothers. The group acquired the franchise for $16 million on May 23 and eventually moved it to Calgary.

Ford lived in Beverly Hills, California, where he illegally raised 140 leghorn chickens until he was stopped by the Beverly Hills Police Department.

Death
Ford retired from acting in 1991, at age 75, following heart and circulatory problems.
He suffered a series of minor strokes which left him in frail health in the years leading up to his death. He died in his Beverly Hills home on August 30, 2006, at the age of 90.

Awards
After being nominated in 1957, 1958 and in 1962, Ford won a Golden Globe Award as Best Actor for his performance in Frank Capra's Pocketful of Miracles, a film he helped produce that was a remake of 1933's Lady for a Day.

Ford was listed in Quigley's Annual List of Top Ten Box Office Champions in 1956, 1958 and 1959, topping the list at number one in 1958. For 10 consecutive years, from 1955 through 1964, Ford was listed among Quigley's list of the top 25 box office stars.

In 1958 Ford won the Golden Laurel Award for Top Male Comedy Performance for his role in Don't Go Near the Water.

For his contribution to the motion picture industry, Ford has a star on the Hollywood Walk of Fame at 6933 Hollywood Blvd. In 1978, he was inducted into the Western Performers Hall of Fame at the National Cowboy & Western Heritage Museum in Oklahoma City, Oklahoma. In 1987, he received the Donostia Award in the San Sebastian International Film Festival, and in 1992, he was awarded the Légion d'honneur medal for his actions in the Second World War.

Ford was scheduled to make his first public appearance in 15 years at a 90th-birthday tribute gala in his honor hosted by the American Cinematheque at Grauman's Egyptian Theatre in Hollywood on May 1, 2006, but at the last minute, he had to bow out. Anticipating that his health might prevent his attendance, Ford had the previous week recorded a special filmed message for the audience, which was screened after a series of in-person tributes from friends, including Martin Landau, Shirley Jones, Jamie Farr, and Debbie Reynolds.

On October 4, 2008, Peter Ford auctioned off some of his father's possessions, including Ford's lacquered cowboy boots (opening bid $2,500), Ford's jacket and cap from The White Tower ($400), his wool trench coat from Young Man with Ideas ($300), and his United States Naval Reserve uniform cap ($250). The auction also offered the sofa where the senior Ford allegedly claimed to have had a romantic encounter with Marilyn Monroe ($1,750).

Legacy
In a 1981 interview Ford said his favorite of his own films were The Blackboard Jungle, Gilda, Cowboy, 3:10 to Yuma, The Sheepman and The Gazebo. "They may not have been the best pictures I did, but they're the ones I remember most fondly because of the people involved," he said. "People like George Marshall, who directed six pictures with me, and Debbie Reynolds."

Filmography

Night in Manhattan (1937) on-camera host as Emcee
Heaven with a Barbed Wire Fence (1939) as Joe
My Son Is Guilty (1939) as Barney
Convicted Woman (1940) as Jim Brent
Men Without Souls (1940) as Johnny Adams
Babies for Sale (1940) as Steve Burton, aka Oscar Hanson
The Lady in Question (1940) as Pierre Morestan
Blondie Plays Cupid (1940) as Charlie
So Ends Our Night (1941) as Ludwig Kern
Texas (1941) as Tod Ramsey
Go West, Young Lady (1941) as Sheriff Tex Miller
The Adventures of Martin Eden (1942) as Martin Eden
Flight Lieutenant (1942) as Danny Doyle
The Desperadoes (1943) as Cheyenne Rogers
Destroyer (1943) as Mickey Donohue
Gilda (1946) as Johnny Farrell / Narrator
A Stolen Life (1946) as Bill Emerson
Gallant Journey (1946) as John Joseph Montgomery
Framed (1947) as Mike Lambert
The Mating of Millie (1948) as Doug Andrews
The Loves of Carmen (1948) as Don José Lizarabengoa
The Return of October (1948) as Prof. Bentley Bassett Jr.
The Man from Colorado (1948) as Col. Owen Devereaux
The Undercover Man (1949) as Frank Warren
Lust for Gold (1949) as Jacob "Dutch" Walz
Mr. Soft Touch (1949) as Joe Miracle
The Doctor and the Girl (1949) as Dr. Michael Corday
The White Tower (1950) as Martin Ordway
Convicted (1950) as Joe Hufford
The Flying Missile (1950) as Cmdr. William A. Talbot
The Redhead and the Cowboy (1951) as Gil Kyle
Follow the Sun (1951) as Ben Hogan
The Secret of Convict Lake (1951) as Jim Canfield
The Green Glove (1952) as Michael "Mike" Blake
Young Man with Ideas (1952) as Maxwell Webster
Affair in Trinidad (1952) as Steve Emery
Time Bomb aka Terror on a Train (1953) as Maj. Peter Lyncort
The Man from the Alamo (1953) as John Stroud
Plunder of the Sun (1953) as Al Colby
The Big Heat (1953) as Det. Sgt. Dave Bannion
Appointment in Honduras (1953) as Steve Corbett
City Story (1954, Short) as Narrator
Human Desire (1954) as Jeff Warren
The Americano (1955) as Sam Dent
The Violent Men (1955) as John Parrish
Blackboard Jungle (1955) as Richard Dadier
Interrupted Melody (1955) as Dr. Thomas "Tom" King
Trial (1955) as David Blake
Ransom! (1956) as David G. "Dave" Stannard
Jubal (1956) as Jubal Troop
The Fastest Gun Alive (1956) as George Temple / George Kelby, Jr.
The Teahouse of the August Moon (1956) as Capt. Fisby
3:10 to Yuma (1957) as Ben Wade
Don't Go Near the Water (1957) as Lt. J.G. Max Siegel
Cowboy (1958) as Tom Reese
The Sheepman (1958) as Jason Sweet
Imitation General (1958) as MSgt. Murphy Savage
Torpedo Run (1958) as Lt. Cmdr. Barney Doyle
It Started with a Kiss (1959) as Sgt. Joe Fitzpatrick
The Gazebo (1959) as Elliott Nash
Cimarron (1960) as Yancey "Cimarron" Cravat
Cry for Happy (1961) as CPO Andy Cyphers
Pocketful of Miracles (1961) as Dave "the Dude" Conway
Four Horsemen of the Apocalypse (1962) as Julio Desnoyers
Experiment in Terror (1962) as John "Rip" Ripley
The Courtship of Eddie's Father (1963) as Tom Corbett
Love Is a Ball (1963) as John Lathrop Davis
Advance to the Rear (1964) as Capt. Jared Heath
Fate Is the Hunter (1964) as Sam C. McBane
Dear Heart (1964) as Harry Mork
The Rounders (1965) as Ben Jones
The Money Trap (1965) as Joe Baron
Is Paris Burning? (1966) as Lt. Gen. Omar N. Bradley
Rage (1966) as Doc Reuben
A Time for Killing (1967) as Maj. Tom Wolcott
The Last Challenge (1967) as Marshal Dan Blaine
Day of the Evil Gun (1968) as Lorne Warfield
Smith! (1969) as Smith
Heaven with a Gun (1969) as Jim Killian / Pastor Jim
The Brotherhood of the Bell (1970, TV Movie) as Prof. Andrew Patterson
Cade's County (1971, TV Series) as Sam Cade
Jarrett (1973, TV Movie) as Sam Jarrett
Santee (1973) as Santee
Target: Eva Jones (1974)
The Greatest Gift (1974, TV Movie) as Rev. Holvak
Punch and Jody (1974, TV Movie) as Peter "Punch" Travers
The Disappearance of Flight 412 (1974, TV Movie) as Colonel Pete Moore
The Family Holvak (1975, TV Series) as Rev. Tom Holvak
Midway (1976) as RAdm. Raymond A. Spruance
Once an Eagle (1976, TV miniseries) as Gen. George Caldwell
The 3,000 Mile Chase (1977, TV Movie) as Paul Dvorak / Leonard Staveck
Evening in Byzantium (1978, TV Movie) as Jesse Craig
Superman (1978) as Jonathan Kent
The Visitor (1979) as Det. Jake Durham
The Sacketts (1979, TV miniseries) as Tom Sunday
Beggarman, Thief (1979, TV Movie) as David Donnelly
The Gift (1979, TV Movie) as Billy Devlin
Day of the Assassin (1979) as Christakis
Virus (1980) as President Richardson
Happy Birthday to Me (1981) as Dr. David Faraday
My Town (1986, TV Series) as Lucas Wheeler
Casablanca Express (1989) as Major Gen. Williams
Border Shootout (1990) as Sheriff John Danaher
Raw Nerve (1991) as Captain Gavin
Final Verdict (1991, TV Movie) as Rev. Rogers (final film role)

Box office ranking
For many years, the Quigley Publishing Company's Poll of Film Exhibitors ranked Ford as one of the most popular stars in the US:
1955 – 12th most popular
1956 – 5th most popular
1957 – 16th most popular
1958 – 1st most popular (also 7th most popular in the UK)
1959 – 6th most popular
1960 – 12th most popular
1961 – 15th most popular
1962 – 21st most popular
1963 – 19th most popular
1964 – 19th most popular

Radio appearances

1942 Lux Radio Theatre A man to remember
1947 Lux Radio Theatre A Stolen Life

References

Bibliography

 Ford, Peter. Glenn Ford: A Life (Wisconsin Film Studies). Madison: University of Wisconsin Press, 2011. .
 Thomas, Nick. Raised by the Stars: Interviews with 29 Children of Hollywood Actors. Jefferson, North Carolina: McFarland, 2011. . (Includes an interview with Ford's son, Peter)
 Wise, James E. and Anne Collier Rehill. Stars in Blue: Movie Actors in America's Sea Services. Annapolis, Maryland: Naval Institute Press, 1997.

External links

 
 
 
 Official website
 Official family-sanctioned website for fans to send condolences
 Photographs and literature
 Co-stars remember Glenn Ford at 100 Omaha World-Herald, May, 2016
 
 Photos of Glenn Ford from "Gilda" and other 1940s films by Ned Scott

1916 births
2006 deaths
20th-century American male actors
20th-century Canadian male actors
American male film actors
Anglophone Quebec people
Best Musical or Comedy Actor Golden Globe (film) winners
Burials at Woodlawn Memorial Cemetery, Santa Monica
California Republicans
Canadian emigrants to the United States
Canadian male film actors
Male Western (genre) film actors
Male actors from Quebec
Male actors from Santa Monica, California
Columbia Pictures contract players
Metro-Goldwyn-Mayer contract players
Military personnel from California
People from Capitale-Nationale
People with acquired American citizenship
Recipients of the Legion of Honour
United States Marine Corps personnel of World War II
United States Marine Corps reservists
United States Marines
United States Navy officers